Sopo is a village located in the Bahr el Ghazal region of South Sudan. The village has a hospital.

References

Bahr el Ghazal
Populated places in South Sudan